Thayer is an English surname found in Somerset, the name derived from English tawyer, one who dressed skins.

Notable people with the name include:

Family 

Thayer family, a Boston Brahmin family and prominent American political family.

Surname 
 Abbott Handerson Thayer (1849–1921), American artist
 Adin Thayer (1816–1890), New York politician
 Alexander Wheelock Thayer (1817–1897), author of The life of Ludwig van Beethoven, a standard biography, and other music biographies
 Albert R. Thayer (1878–1965), painter and etcher
 America Thayer (died 2021), American murder victim
 Amos Madden Thayer (1841–1905), United States federal judge
 Andrew J. Thayer (1818–1873), attorney and legislator
 Betty Thayer (born 1958), businesswoman
 Bronson Thayer (1939–2016), executive
 Brynn Thayer (born 1949), American actress
 Caroline Matilda Warren Thayer, American educator, novelist and children's writer
 Charles W. Thayer (1910–1969), US military officer, diplomat and author (fiction and non fiction)
 Dale Thayer (born 1980), baseball pitcher
 David Thayer (born 1949), birth name of Teddy Harvia, cartoonist
 Deborah Jinza Thayer, choreographer
 Donnette Thayer, vocalist and guitarist
 Douglas Thayer (1929–2017), American writer
 Edwin Pope Thayer, Secretary of the United States Senate 1925–1933
 Eli Thayer (1819–1899), Kansas politician
 Ella Cheever Thayer (1849–1925), playwright and novelist
 Emma Homan Thayer (1842–1908), American botanical artist and author
 Ernest Thayer (1863–1940), American poet, author of "Casey at the Bat"
 Francis S. Thayer (1822–1880), New York politician
 George Thayer (1905–1952), American football player
 Greg Thayer (born 1949), baseball pitcher
 Harry Thayer (disambiguation), several people
 Helen Thayer, explorer
 Helen Rand Thayer (1863-1935), American social reformer
 Henry W. Thayer (1867-1940), co-founder of the Decorative Designers
 James Thayer (born 1949), thriller writer
 James Thayer (Medal of Honor) (born 1853), United States Navy sailor and Medal of Honor recipient
 James Bradley Thayer (1831–1902), American legal writer and educationist
 James B. Thayer (1922–2018), United States military  officer and businessman
 Jeritt Thayer (born 1986), American soccer player
 Jesse B. Thayer (1845–1910), educator
 John Thayer (disambiguation), several people
 Joseph Henry Thayer (1828–1901), American biblical scholar
 Lorna Thayer (1919–2005), American actress
 Maria Thayer (born 1975), American actress/comedian
 Marian Thayer, Titanic survivor
 Martin Russell Thayer (1819–1906), politician
 Max Thayer (born 1946), American movie actor
 Nate Thayer (1960-2023), American journalist who interviewed Pol Pot
 Nathaniel Thayer (1769–1840), minister
 Nathaniel Thayer, Jr. (1808–1883), railroad developer
 Orla Ed Thayer, inventor of the Thayer Valve for trombones
 Otis B. Thayer (1862–1935), American actor, director and film producer
 Pauline Revere Thayer (1860–1934), benefactor
 Robert H. Thayer (1901–1984), American lawyer, naval officer and diplomat.
 Samuel J. F. Thayer (1842–1893), American architect
 Samuel R. Thayer (1837–1909), attorney and diplomat
 Scofield Thayer (1889–1982), American poet and publisher
 Sigourney Thayer (1896–1944), theatrical producer
 Simeon Thayer (1737–1800), American officer of the American Revolutionary War
 Stella F. Thayer (born 1940), president of the National Museum of Racing and Hall of Fame
 Steve Thayer (born 1953), novelist
 Stuart Thayer (1926–2009), American circus historian
 Susan Thayer, American artist
 Sylvanus Thayer (1785–1872), United States general
 Thomas Thayer (1812–1886), theologian
 Tiffany Thayer (1902–1959), founder of the Fortean Society
 Tom Thayer (born 1961), NFL player
 Tommy Thayer (born 1960), lead guitarist of KISS
 W. Paul Thayer (William Paul Thayer, 1919–2010), test pilot
 W. W. Thayer (William Wallace Thayer, 1827–1899), sixth Governor of Oregon
 Wallace Thayer (1866–1944), New York assemblyman
 Webster Thayer (1857–1933), the judge at the trial of Sacco and Vanzetti
 Whitney Eugene Thayer (1838–1889), American organist and composer
 William Thayer (disambiguation), several people

Given name 
 Thayer David (1927–1978), film and TV actor
 Thayer Munford (born 1999), American football player

See also
 Justice Thayer (disambiguation)